Seraphim Rose (born Eugene Dennis Rose; August 13, 1934 – September 2, 1982), also known as Seraphim of Platina, was an American hieromonk of the Russian Orthodox Church Outside Russia who co-founded the Saint Herman of Alaska Monastery in Platina, California. He translated Eastern Orthodox Christian texts and authored several works (some of them considered polemical). His writings have been credited with helping to spread Eastern Orthodox Christianity throughout the West; his popularity equally extended to Russia itself, where his works were secretly reproduced and distributed by samizdat during the Communist era, remaining popular today.

Rose's opposition to Eastern Orthodox participation in the ecumenical movement and his advocacy of the contentious "toll house teaching", led him into conflict with some notable figures in 20th-century Orthodoxy and he remains controversial in some quarters even after his sudden death from an undiagnosed intestinal disorder in 1982. Though he has not yet been formally canonized by any Orthodox synod, many Orthodox Christians hold him in high esteem, venerating him in iconography, liturgy and prayer.

Rose's monastery is currently affiliated with the Serbian Orthodox Church and continues to carry on his work of publishing and Orthodox missionary activity.

Early life
Eugene Rose was born on August 13, 1934, in San Diego, California. His father, Frank Rose, was a World War I veteran who operated the city's first "Karmel Korn Shop" together with his wife Esther Rose, Eugene's mother. His ancestors had come to the United States from France, Norway and the Netherlands.

In addition to being a businesswoman, Esther was a California artist who specialized in impressionist renderings of Pacific coast scenes. Raised in San Diego, Eugene would remain a Californian the rest of his life. His older sister was Eileen Rose Busby, an author, Mensa member, and antiques expert; his older brother was Frank Rose, a local businessman.

Though Rose was described by one biographer as a "natural athlete" in his youth, he did not engage seriously in sport. Baptized in a Methodist church when he was 14 years old, Rose later rejected Christianity for atheism. After graduating from San Diego High School, he attended Pomona College, where he studied Chinese philosophy and graduated magna cum laude in 1956. While at Pomona, he was a reader for Ved Mehta, a blind student who would go on to become a well known author. Mehta referred to Rose in two books, one of which was a book of memoirs called Stolen Light: “I felt very lucky to have found Gene as a reader. ... He read with such clarity that I almost had the illusion that he was explaining things.” Afterward, Rose studied under Alan Watts at the American Academy of Asian Studies before entering the master's degree program in Oriental languages at the University of California, Berkeley, where he graduated in 1961 with a thesis entitled "'Emptiness' and 'Fullness' in the Lao Tzu".

In addition to a gift for languages, Rose was known for possessing an acute sense of humor and wit. He enjoyed opera, concerts, art, literature, and the other cultural opportunities richly available in San Francisco, where he settled after his graduation and explored Buddhism and other Asian philosophies.

Spiritual search
While studying at Watts' Asian institute, Rose read the writings of French metaphysicist René Guénon and also met a Chinese Taoist scholar, Gi-ming Shien. Shien emphasized the ancient Chinese approach to learning, valuing traditional viewpoints and texts over more modern interpretations. Inspired by Shien, Rose took up the study of ancient Chinese so that he could read early Tao texts in their original tongue. Through his experiences with Shien and the writings of Guénon, Rose sought out an authentic and grounded spiritual tradition of his own.

At age 22 in 1956 and while he was still at Pomona College, Rose came out as gay. During a romantic relationship with Jon Gregerson, Rose was exposed to the Russian Orthodox Church Outside of Russia. While the relationship lasted a significant period, Gregerson lost interest in Orthodoxy despite Rose's growing interest. Rose ultimately terminated the relationship and later commented on the period prior to his conversion, saying "I was in hell. I know what hell is." Rose is reported to have not externally expressed his sexuality following his conversion. Rose's sexuality was a topic of controversy among some Eastern Orthodox faithful after it was publicized in Cathy Scott's 2000 biography Seraphim Rose.

Orthodoxy
In 1962, Rose was received into the Russian Orthodox Church Outside Russia in San Francisco. He quickly distinguished himself to the bishop of San Francisco, St. John Maximovitch, as a serious and studious convert. In 1963, Archbishop John blessed Rose and his new friend, Gleb Podmoshensky, a Russian Orthodox seminarian, to form a community of Orthodox booksellers and publishers, the St. Herman of Alaska Brotherhood. In March 1964, Rose opened an Orthodox bookstore next to the Holy Virgin Cathedral on Geary Boulevard in San Francisco, which was under construction at the time. In 1965 the brotherhood founded the St. Herman Press publishing house, which still exists.

Increasingly drawn to a more reclusive lifestyle, Rose's community ultimately decided to leave the city for the northern California wilderness, where Rose and Podmoshensky became monks in 1968 and transformed the Saint Herman of Alaska Brotherhood into a full-fledged monastic community. Rose's parents provided the down payment for a mountaintop near the isolated hamlet of Platina, where Rose and some friends built a monastery named for St. Herman of Alaska. At his tonsure, in October 1970, Rose took the name "Seraphim" after St. Seraphim of Sarov. He wrote, translated and studied for the priesthood in his cell, a one-roomed cabin with neither running water nor electricity, where he would spend the rest of his days. He was ordained in 1977 by Bishop Nektary of Seattle, spiritual son of St. Nectarius of Optina, the last of the great Optina startsy.

In his ministry, Rose spoke frequently of an "Orthodoxy of the Heart", which he saw as increasingly absent in American ecclesiastical life. He also spoke of the need for warmth and kindness of the spirit, especially when dealing with those with whom one disagreed, an increasing problem in Eastern Orthodoxy in America, and its conflict between so-called "traditionalists" and "modernists". One can be firm, Rose insisted, without having to compromise basic Christian teachings on lovingkindness, longsuffering, and mercy toward others.

Works
Using a hand-cranked printing press at his Geary Boulevard bookstore, Rose founded the bimonthly magazine The Orthodox Word in January 1965; this periodical is still published (on modern presses) today. He also composed and published dozens of other titles, including God's Revelation to the Human Heart, Orthodoxy and the Religion of the Future, and The Soul After Death; all remain in print. He translated and printed Fr. Michael Pomazansky's Orthodox Dogmatic Theology, which remains a text for clerical students and laymen alike. Rose translated his books into Russian, and they were circulated widely as samizdat within the Soviet Union, although they were not formally published until after the fall of the Communist regime. He was also one of the first American Eastern Orthodox Christians to translate major works of several church fathers into English.

Controversies over theological opinions or "theologoumena"

"Toll houses"
Although most of Rose's works were widely received within the Orthodox community, a few raised controversy. The most notable of these was The Soul After Death, which describes certain "aerial toll houses" described by various Church Fathers and saints. According to this teaching, every human soul must pass through a series of these stations after death as part of their initial judgment by God, where they will be accused of specific sins and possibly condemned to hell.

Some modern Orthodox theologians, including Archbishop Lazar Puhalo, Stanley Harakas and Alexandros Kalomiros among others, have claimed that certain ideas in Rose's book are heretical, and that many of the Church Fathers have been misinterpreted or misquoted to support it. Puhalo claimed that the "toll-house theory" is specifically Gnostic in origin. These accusations were later declared to be wrong by the Holy Synod of the Russian Church Abroad, which emphasized that little has been revealed to the Church on this subject, and hence all controversy concerning it should cease. A similar position was adopted by Fr. Michael Azkoul in his 1998 book, Aerial Toll-House Myth: The Neo-Gnosticism of Fr Seraphim Rose. A recent publication called, The Departure of the Soul, published by St. Anthony's Monastery in Arizona, presents a collection of writings by Church Fathers in favor of the Toll Houses.

He endeavored to answer his detractors in his "Answer to a Critic", published as an appendix to The Soul After Death.

Though continuing to vehemently oppose Rose's teaching on this subject, Puhalo indicated that he considered Rose to be a "true ascetic", and that he respected the sincerity of Seraphim's monastic life and intentions. In one of his vlogs, Archbishop Lazar said of Fr. Rose: “Father Seraphim Rose was an astonishing ascetic. He had a great ascetic life. He had enormous struggles, enormous inner struggles, and he struggled with them in really great asceticism. So I don’t want anybody to denigrate or think anyone is denigrating Father Seraphim Rose’s ascetic struggle. It really was a great ascetic struggle, and there should be a reverence and a respect for that. … Again, I want people to have a reverence for Father Seraphim Rose’s ascetic struggle, and to acknowledge that, and see that there was a special spark there, in that he had enormous internal struggles, and that he saw those through to the end of his life. And that is a great virtue and a great reason to have a certain reverence for Father Seraphim.”

Evolution vs. creationism
Rose also waded into the ongoing debate between Biblical creationism and evolution, asserting in Genesis, Creation and Early Man that Orthodox patristics exclusively supported the creationist viewpoint. This idea was vehemently attacked by other Orthodox theologians, who asserted that while man's existence is not accidental by any means, there is no official church doctrine as to the precise process God used in creation, nor the length of time that it might have required. In the 2011 edition of Rose's "Genesis, Creation and Early Man", his spiritual child and editor, Hieromonk Damascene, alleges to have demonstrated that Rose's teaching is in accord with the great saints and elders of the 19th and 20th centuries who have spoken on the issue, such as St. Theophan the Recluse, St. John of Kronstadt, St. Justin Popovich, St. Paisios, and Elder Sophrony. However, in his response to Kalomiros's article "The Eternal Will" (The Christian Activist, Volume 11, Fall/Winter 1997), Rose stated that: "I should state an elementary truth: modern science, when it deals with scientific facts, does indeed usually know more than the holy Fathers, and the holy Fathers can easily make mistakes of scientific facts; it is not scientific facts which we look for in the holy Fathers, but true theology and the true philosophy which is based on theology."

Death

After feeling acute pains for several days while working in his cell in August 1982, a reluctant Rose was taken by fellow monks to Mercy Medical Center in Redding for treatment. When he arrived at the hospital, he was declared to be in critical condition and fell into semi-consciousness. After exploratory surgery was completed, it was discovered that a blood clot had blocked a vein supplying blood to his intestines, which had become a mass of dead tissue. He slipped into a coma after a second surgery, never regaining consciousness. Hundreds of people visited the hospital and celebrated the Divine Liturgy regularly in its chapel, praying for a miracle to save Rose's life. Prayers were offered for the ailing hieromonk from places as far away as Mount Athos, Greece, the spiritual heart of Orthodox monasticism. Rose died on September 2, 1982.

Rose's body lay in repose for several days in a simple wooden coffin at his wilderness monastery. Visitors claimed that Rose's body did not succumb to decay and rigor mortis, remaining supple and even allegedly smelling of roses.

Legacy 
Some Orthodox Christians anticipate Rose's canonization. At the 40th anniversary of Rose's death, Metropolitan Nikoloz of Akhalkalaki, from the Orthodox Church of Georgia, called for the canonization of Seraphim Rose. Before returning to Georgia, Metropolitan Nikoloz brought the question of canonization to Bishop Maxim of the Serbian Orthodox Church's Eparchy of Western America. A few days later, on September 6th, 2022, Metropolitan Neophytos of Morphou, of the Orthodox Church of Cyprus gave a sermon calling Fr. Seraphim Rose a saint.

Several reputed miraculous events, healings and apparitions of Rose have been reported around the world, commencing soon after his death. In one such instance, a nun named Zvezdana at Prohor Pčinjski Monastery in Serbia informed her abbess that she had repeatedly felt the presence of Fr. Seraphim, and that he appeared to her on one occasion. She continued to pray, telling Seraphim that it was beautiful in his monastery. He replied, saying “It’s beautiful here Prohor Pčinjski Monastery also—beautified by the relics of Fr. Prohor.”

St. Herman's Monastery today

The St. Herman of Alaska Monastery in Platina is now a part of the Western America diocese of the Serbian Orthodox Church. While all of the brothers are currently American, many speak Russian. Their primary emphasis continues to be the printing of books, which has been the major activity of the brotherhood since its inception. In addition, the monastery has assisted with the guardianship and education of local youths with behavioral or learning problems, which has earned Rose's brotherhood significant respect among the locals. Visitors come to the monastery year-round but especially on September 2, the anniversary of Rose's death.

Bibliography

 Blessed John the Wonderworker: A Preliminary Account of the Life and Miracles of Archbishop John Maximovitch. Platina: St. Herman of Alaska Brotherhood, 1987.
 Genesis, Creation and Early Man. Platina: St. Herman of Alaska Brotherhood, 2000.
 God's Revelation to the Human Heart. Platina: Saint Herman Press, 1988.
 Letters from Father Seraphim. Nikodemos Orthodox Publication Society.
 Nihilism: The Root of the Revolution of the Modern Age. Platina: St. Herman of Alaska Brotherhood, 1994. (as Eugene Rose).
 Orthodoxy and the Religion of the Future. Platina: Saint Herman of Alaska Brotherhood, 1975.
 The Apocalypse: In the Teachings of Ancient Christianity. Platina: Saint Herman of Alaska Brotherhood, 1985.
 The Place of Blessed Augustine in the Orthodox Church. Platina: Saint Herman of Alaska Brotherhood, 1983.
 The Soul After Death: Contemporary "After-Death" Experiences in the Light of the Orthodox Teaching on the Afterlife. Platina: St. Herman of Alaska Brotherhood, 1988.
 Orthodox Survival Course. Samizdat Press, 2019.

References

Biographical resources
Father Seraphim: His Life and Work. Revised and expanded version of Not of This World
Letters from Father Seraphim. Correspondence with Fr. Alexey Young (now Hieromonk Ambrose), Rose's spiritual son
Not of This World: the Life and Teaching of Fr Seraphim Rose. A biography by monk Damascene Christensen (out of print)
Seraphim Rose: The True Story and Private Letters. A biography of Rose's life, letters and works by Cathy Scott, Rose's niece

External links
Death to the World Magazine Online Orthodox publication containing some of Rose's writings
Death to the World Website Online collection of writings by and inspired by Rose
"Genesis and Early Man: The Orthodox Patristic Understanding", Reply to pro-evolution speech given by Orthodox theologian Dr. Alexander Kalomiros
Nihilism: The Root of the Revolution of the Modern Age. Book written by Rose
Russian Orthodox Church Outside Russia Unofficial icon of Rose

1934 births
1982 deaths
People from San Diego
20th-century Christian mystics
20th-century Eastern Orthodox clergy
20th-century American writers
20th-century Eastern Orthodox priests
20th-century American male writers
American Eastern Orthodox priests
Eastern Orthodox Christians from the United States
Eastern Orthodox priests in the United States
Eastern Orthodox monks
Eastern Orthodox writers
Eastern Orthodox mystics
Eastern Orthodox theologians
LGBT and Eastern Orthodoxy
Priests of the Russian Orthodox Church Outside of Russia
Converts to Eastern Orthodoxy from atheism or agnosticism
Former Methodists
Folk saints
Traditionalist School
Pomona College alumni
Books by Cathy Scott
UC Berkeley College of Letters and Science alumni
American people of Norwegian descent
American people of French descent
American people of Dutch descent
Burials at Serbian Orthodox monasteries and churches
Palamism
San Diego High School alumni